Abeno Shrine (阿部野神社, Abeno jinja) is a Shinto shrine located in Abeno-ku, Osaka Prefecture, Japan. Its main festival is held annually on January 24. It was founded in 1882, and enshrines the kami of Kitabatake Chikafusa and Kitabatake Akiie. It is one of the Fifteen Shrines of the Kenmu Restoration.

See also
Fifteen Shrines of the Kenmu Restoration

External links
Official website

Abeno-ku, Osaka
Shinto shrines in Osaka
1882 establishments in Japan
Beppyo shrines